Toutatis is an upcoming steel launched roller coaster located at Parc Astérix in Plailly, France. Toutatis was first announced at the IAAPA Orlando Expo in 2018 and upon opening in 2023 will become France's tallest and fastest coaster. It will feature four launches with a top speed of 66.5 mph and a 167-foot top hat.

History

Announcement
During a documentary helmed by TF1 on May 20, 2018, Parc Astérix's head of construction Frédéric Dubosc explicitly stated that, "To be honest we are currently working on a magnetic launch coaster". Continuing on this revelation, Dubosc cited Taron at Phantasialand as the park's inspiration, an Intamin launch coaster that had debuted two years earlier and performed extraordinarily well.

On November 15, 2018, Intamin and park operator Compagnie des Alpes officially unveiled the unnamed launch coaster at the IAAPA Expo in Orlando, Florida. This was announced alongside Kondaa, another Intamin project that would debut at Walibi Belgium in 2021. The coaster would be built within a new 20,813 m² area behind the Trace du Hourra bobsled roller coaster and was planned to open for the 2021 season.

Construction
In July 2019, reports surfaced that the coaster had been pushed back to 2022 by a lengthy process to secure first demolition permits, as much of the woods was under protection. The attraction development was further delayed to an opening date of 2023 by the impact of the COVID-19 pandemic. The full environmental impact assessment became publicly available in September 2020, detailing the construction schematics, budgets, and timeline of the coaster that would be named Toutatis.

Land clearing and foundation work took place during later summer and the fall of 2021. The first coaster rails began to arrive at the park in early 2022, and construction quietly began while Gravity Group crews were onsite conducting a renovation of Tonnerre 2 Zeus. Track was placed at the highest point and topped off the coaster in June 2022.

In July 2022, project manager Damien Thibault revealed in an interview that the coaster would be accompanied by the addition of Le Festival De Toutatis, a Nebulaz attraction from Italian manufacturer Zamperla.

Characteristics

Statistics
The layout will include four launches – three of which will occur on a swing launch between a vertical spike and top hat. The coaster will run three trains of five cars, each of which will seat two rows of two riders for a total of 20 passengers per train. It will also have similar elements to Pantheon at Busch Gardens Williamsburg.

Theme

Toutatis (pronounced  in Gaulish) is a Celtic god who was worshipped in ancient Gaul and Britain, and widely interpreted to be a tribal protector. In the Asterix comics, the name is commonly used within the catchphrase "By Toutatis!" to parody religious swearing. Toutatis' thematic set pieces are to be designed and produced by Bordeaux-based KAERU Theme Park Design, a firm that had also worked on OzIris.

Budget
Throughout the development, manufacturing, and construction of Toutatis, Parc Astérix spent a total of €28 million ($29.7 USD). The recorded expendure is as seen below;

References

External links

Roller coasters
Roller coasters planned to open in 2023
Roller coasters in France
Bandes dessinées in amusement parks